The Tennessee Volunteers women's tennis team represents the University of Tennessee, in Knoxville, TN. The program has qualified for 29 NCAA Tournaments, including 20 straight from 1995 to 2014. They are led by former player and current 6th year head coach Alison Ojeda.

Along with all other UT women's sports teams, it used the nickname "Lady Volunteers" (or the short form "Lady Vols") until the 2015–16 school year, when the school dropped the "Lady" prefix from the nicknames of all women's teams except in basketball. In 2017 the university announced the return of the “Lady Volunteer” name.

History
All-time, the Lady Vols have appeared in 29 NCAA tournaments with their best result being a semifinal birth in 2002. Their 29 NCAA appearances puts them at 4th in the SEC behind Florida (39), Georgia (35), and South Carolina (31). Additionally the women's tennis team is one of only 2 programs at Tennessee (the other is women's golf) to never win a conference championship. The Lady Vols have finished 2nd in the SEC Regular Season 5 times (2001, 2003, 2009, 2010, 2011), and lost in the final of the SEC Tournament 4 times (2001, 2009, 2010, 2011).

Mike Patrick and Sonia Hahn-Patrick era
Mike Patrick led the Lady Volunteer Tennis program for 30 years, 20 of which where he served as Co-Head Coach with his with Sonia Han-Patrick, before he resigned on November 16, 2016. Patrick was the winningest coach in Lady Vol program history compiling a 473-310 all-time record. Of Patrick's 30 seasons, 23 teams finished the year ranked in the top 25. Patrick’s best finish in the NCAA tournament came with a semifinal appearance in 2002. Additionally, the 2001 team achieved the programs first #1 national ranking, and finished 6th in the nation with a 25-4 (10-1 SEC) record. They came within 1 match of an SEC Regular season title following a 4-3 loss to #5 Florida, and subsequently lost the SEC Tournament final to #2 Georgia. Patrick's assistant coach Alison Ojeda, a former All-American at Tennessee, took over the program in 2017.

Alison Ojeda era
In Ojeda's first six seasons as head coach, she has guided the Lady Vols to the NCAA Tournament every season but 2020 when the tournament was cancelled.

The 2017 season saw Tennessee finish with their most wins since 2011, posting a 19-12 record, and finishing the season ranked #24 in the ITA rankings. The season ended in the NCAA round of 32 with a 4-1 loss to #15 seed Duke.

The 2018 season began with a 12-0 record, the programs best start in program a history; however, the team struggled in SEC play finishing with a 3-10 conference record. The year ended with a 18-12 mark, and a 4-2 loss to Oregon in the first round of the NCAA Tournament.

In Ojeda’s third season (2019), Tennessee reached new heights by finishing with their most wins since 2003, and making their third consecutive NCAA tournament. The team finished 4th in the SEC with a 9-4 record, and was ranked #20 in the ITA rankings with a 20-8 record. The run ended with a 4-0 loss in the NCAA second round to #12 seed NC State.

In 2020, Tennessee got off to a 10-3 (1-2 SEC) before the season was cancelled due to the COVID-19 pandemic after their 4-3 match win against Ole Miss.

The 2021 season saw Tennessee finish 5th in the SEC with an 8-5 mark in SEC play. They entered the NCAA Tournament with a 16-8 record after a loss in the SEC tournament semifinal to #3 ranked Georgia. Despite being ranked 15th in the ITA rankings, the Lady Vols were not awarded one of the NCAA Tournament’s top 16 seeds, who host the first and second rounds of the tournament. Thus, they travelled to the Charlottesville regional, where the beat James Madison 4-0 in the round of 64, then fell to #14 seed Virginia, in a close match, 4-2. This concluded the 2021 season, and the team’s 17-9 campaign. 

The 2022 season saw the Lady Vols return to the NCAA tournament for the 5th season in a row (2020 tournament was cancelled), and finish 7th in the conference with a 7-6 record. They advanced to the semifinals of the SEC Tournament via a 4-2 upset of #2 seed and twelfth ranked Auburn. The season concluded with a 16-10 record and a 4-1 loss to #6 NC State in the NCAA Round of 32.

Head coaches
Source

Yearly Record
Source

See also
Tennessee Volunteers men's tennis

References

External links
 

University of Tennessee
Tennessee Volunteers women's tennis
College women's tennis teams in the United States